"When I Held Ya" is a song performed by singer Moa Lignell, who finished third on Swedish Idol 2011. The song was released on 20 January 2012 as a Digital download on iTunes in Sweden. The song has peaked at number four on the Swedish Singles Chart.

Track listing

Charts

Release history

References 

2012 singles
Moa Lignell songs
2012 songs
Universal Music Group singles